A Season in Hell (Une Saison en Enfer) is a poetic work by Arthur Rimbaud.

A Season in Hell may also refer to:

 A Season in Hell (1971 film), a 1971 drama film starring Terence Stamp
 A Season in Hell (1964 film), a 1964 Australian TV film
 Une saison en enfer (album) (translated as A Season in Hell), a 1991 album by singer-songwriter Léo Ferré, who set the whole eponymous poetic work of Rimbaud into music
 A Season in Hell (album), a 2006 album by Chicago pop-punk band October Fall
 A Season in Hell, a 1989 novel by Jack Higgins
 A Season in Hell, an album from film Eddie and the Cruisers